"Battle Cry" is the third and final single released by Barbadian singer Shontelle from her album Shontelligence (2008). It was the third single taken from the album following "T-Shirt" and "Stuck with Each Other". The song was sent to radio as the third single in the US on June 9, 2009 and was released in the UK as a digital single bundle on August 10, 2009.

Song information

Shontelle has since announced on her official Twitter page that "Battle Cry" will still be released as the album's third single, stating that "Battle Cry is up next baby!".

The song was released as a promo single in the U.S. on October 21, 2008, for the Barack Obama compilation album. The song was accompanied with a music video featuring Shontelle and various clips in tribute to President Obama. The song failed to chart in the United States. Nearly a year later, on June 9, 2009, the song was released in the US as the third single from the album, and right before its release the official video was filmed, and has been released in the UK, and was released in the US in July, 2009.

Speaking of the song's background in February 2009 to noted UK R&B writer Pete Lewis of the award-winning Blues & Soul, Shontelle stated: "While I always loved 'Battle Cry' in its own right as a power anthem and for its really inspirational theme, for me the coolest thing about it now is that we actually got a call from Barack Obama's people saying they'd heard the song, they felt its theme really suited their campaign, and that they'd love to feature it on their fundraising record 'Yes We Can; Voices Of A Grass Roots Movement'! You know, as soon as they told me that, I was like 'You don't even have to ASK! You can use ANY of my songs for ANYTHING to do with Barack Obama!'!"

Music video
In October 2008 Shontelle released a "Battle Cry" tribute video for Barack Obama on YouTube as it was featured on the compilation album Yes We Can: Voices of Grass Roots Movement.

In May 2009, she shot the official music video for the single release in Los Angeles, California with video director Jessy Terrero. On June 26, Shontelle's official music video for Battle Cry premiered on her official fansite.

Track listings
UK Digital Single

"Battle Cry" (UK Radio Edit)
"Battle Cry" (Ill Blu Remix)

UK Digital Single EP 

"Battle Cry" (UK Radio Edit)
"Battle Cry" (Ill Blu Remix)
"Battle Cry" (Lee Hazard Mix)

Charts

Radio and release history

References

2009 singles
Music videos directed by Jessy Terrero
Shontelle songs
Songs written by Wayne Wilkins
Songs written by Polow da Don
2009 songs
Motown singles
SRC Records singles